Rudolf Schweinberger (born 10 April 1935) is an Austrian ski jumper. He competed in the individual event at the 1956 Winter Olympics.

References

1935 births
Living people
Austrian male ski jumpers
Olympic ski jumpers of Austria
Ski jumpers at the 1956 Winter Olympics
Place of birth missing (living people)